Traumascapes: The Power and Fate of Places Transformed by Tragedy is a 2005 book by Australian academic Maria Tumarkin.  Tumarkin aims to "start a conversation about the tangible imprints left behind" at places of violent suffering. The book discusses seven such example locations: Bali, Berlin, Manhattan, Moscow, Port Arthur, Sarajevo, and the Pennsylvania crash site of the fourth September 11 plane.

References

Australian political books
Australian non-fiction books
2005 non-fiction books